The 1932 All-Eastern football team consists of American football players chosen by various selectors as the best players at each position among the Eastern colleges and universities during the 1932 college football season. 

Three Eastern players were selected to the All-Eastern team and were also consensus picks on the 1932 All-America college football team: halfback Warren Heller of Pittsburgh; guard Milton Summerfelt of Army and end Joe Skladany of Pittsburgh.

All-Eastern selections

Quarterbacks
 Cliff Montgomery, Columbia (AP-1)
 Robert Ramsay Chase, Brown (CP)

Halfbacks
 Warren Heller, Pittsburgh (AP-1, CP)
 Felix Vidal, Army (AP-1)
 Whitney Ask, Colgate (CP)

Fullbacks
 Bart Viviano (AP-1, CP)

Ends
 Joe Skladany, Pittsburgh (AP-1, CP)
 Jose Martinez-Zorilla, Cornell (AP-1)
 Matal, Columbia (CP)

Tackles
 Howard Colehower, Penn (AP-1, CP)
 Walter Uzdavinis, Fordham (AP-1)
 Jim Zyntell, Holy Cross (CP)

Guards
 Milton Summerfelt, Army (AP-1, CP)
 Robert Smith, Colgate (AP-1, CP)

Centers
 Roy Engle, Penn (AP-1)
 Tom Gilbane, Brown (CP)

Key
 AP = Associated Press
 CP = Central Press Association, selected by the football captains of the Eastern teams

See also
 1932 College Football All-America Team

References

All-Eastern
All-Eastern college football teams